Paul Carpenter Standley (March 21, 1884 – June 2, 1963) was an American botanist known for his work on neotropical plants.



Standley was born on March 21, 1884 in Avalon, Missouri. He attended Drury College in Springfield, Missouri and New Mexico State College, where he received a bachelor's degree in 1907, and received a master's degree from New Mexico State College in 1908. He remained at New Mexico State College as an assistant from 1908–1909. He was the Assistant Curator of the Division of Plants at the United States National Museum from 1909 to 1922. 

In spring, 1928, he took a position at the Field Museum of Natural History in Chicago, where worked until 1950. While at the Field Museum he did fieldwork in Guatemala between 1938 and 1941. After his retirement in 1950, he moved to the Escuela Agricola Panamericana, where he worked in the library and herbarium and did field work until 1956, when he stopped doing botanical work. In 1957 he moved to Tegucigalpa, Honduras, where he died on June 2, 1963.

He contributed to the Trees and Shrubs of Mexico, Flora of Guatemala, and Flora of Costa Rica.

Family 
His sister Penelope "Nellie" Standley was also a botanical collector.

Honours
Three genera of plants have been named after him; in 1932, botanist Alexander Curt Brade published Standleya, which is a genus of flowering plants from Brazil, belonging to the family Rubiaceae. Then in 1971, botanists R.M. King & H. Rob. published Standleyanthus, which is a genus of Central American plants in the boneset tribe within the sunflower family. Lastly in 1993, botanist Frank Almeda published Stanmarkia, which is a genus of flowering plants from Mexico and Guatemala, belonging to the family Melastomataceae. The name also honours another American botanist Julian Alfred Steyermark (1909–1988).

References

External links 
 
Standley's botanical collecting notebooks vol.1 in Field Museum Digital Collections; more volumes

Orchidologists
1884 births
1963 deaths
Botanists active in Central America
People associated with the Field Museum of Natural History
New Mexico State University alumni
People from Livingston County, Missouri
20th-century American botanists